Michael Berrer was the defending champion but decided not to participate.
Martin Kližan won the final against Stefan Koubek 7–6(4), 6–2.

Seeds

Draw

Finals

Top half

Bottom half

References
 Main Draw
 Qualifying Draw

Ritro Slovak Open - Singles
2010 Men's Singles